Pentateucha is a genus of moths in the family Sphingidae. The genus was erected by Charles Swinhoe in 1908.

Species
Pentateucha curiosa C. Swinhoe, 1908
Pentateucha inouei Owada & Brechlin, 1997
Pentateucha stueningi Owada & Kitching, 1997

References

Sphingulini
Moth genera
Taxa named by Charles Swinhoe